Glyphipterix luteomaculata is a species of sedge moth in the genus Glyphipterix. It was described by Yutaka Arita in 1979. It is found in Japan (Ryukyu) and Taiwan.

The wingspan 9–13 mm.

References

Moths described in 1979
Glyphipterigidae
Moths of Japan
Moths of Taiwan